This is a list of wind farms in Australia, with a generating capacity of more than 50 MW, which are operating, under construction, or for which planning approval has been received.

Operating

Under construction
Large wind farms approved and under construction

See also

List of proposed wind farms in Australia
List of onshore wind farms
List of wind farms in New South Wales
List of wind farms in Queensland
List of wind farms in South Australia
List of wind farms in Tasmania
List of wind farms in Victoria
List of wind farms in Western Australia
Wind power in Australia
Wind power in South Australia

References

Wind Farms
Australia